Albine Caillie (born 9 November 1974) is a French road cyclist. After becoming national time trial champion in 1998 she represented her nation at the 1998 UCI Road World Championships. At the 2000 UCI Road World Championships she finished 7th in the individual time trial. In 2000 and 2001 she won the silver medal at the national time trial championships.

References

External links
 profile at les-sports.info

1974 births
French female cyclists
Living people
Place of birth missing (living people)
Cyclists from Paris